The Ray of Creation is an esoteric cosmology which was taught by G. I. Gurdjieff. It is a diagram which better represents the place which Earth occupies in the Universe. The diagram has eight levels, each corresponding to Gurdjieff's Law of Octaves (see In Search of the Miraculous, chapter 7).

Levels

The first level is "The Absolute", followed by "All Worlds", "All Suns", "Sun", "All Planets", "Earth", "Moon", and "The Absolute":

 The heaviest/last level - "The Absolute"
 Earth's satellite - "The Moon"
 Our planet - "Earth"
 All of the planets in the solar system to which Earth belongs to - "All Planets"
 The planets belong to the "Sun" or the solar system
 The Sun belongs to the Milky Way galaxy or the "All Suns" combined
 All galaxies put together belong to "All Worlds"
 All Worlds form a final whole called "The Absolute"

This lineage indicates and compares the construction of all of the levels, matters, and laws of the Universe, placing them in scale with one another.

Laws

It was taught that in "The Absolute" the three holy forces form a whole, and thereby there is only one law (force) in the Absolute (which is the Will of the Absolute). The three forces of this law converge to form "All Worlds", whose level, now, being a part of the whole now has three laws. This level also having three forces, acts in creating "All Suns" in a similar process, and thereby "All Suns" has six laws (three new ones and three of the All Worlds level). Similarly, "Sun" has 12 laws, "All Planets" 24 laws, "Earth" 48 laws, "Moon" 96 laws, and "The Absolute" 192 laws.

Each level after the Absolute has a bigger number of laws which govern it. Therefore, the further the level is away from the Absolute, the more mechanical the living things in it are. By this comparison it is claimed that there are 48 laws governing the life of living beings on Earth, thereby also claiming that the life on Earth is quite mechanical.
Note that "the three holy forces" above, have manifestations in the physical universe as we know it today, such as are studies by physicists, other scientists. That is, aspects of "The Ray of Creation" as taught by Gurdjieff, Ouspensky, and others, can be understood and described by modern science and scientists.
Please also note that "The Absolute" mentioned here does not refer to God as it is normally understood or described by most humans.

Matter

Similarly to the difference of laws on each level, the level (in this case 'density') of matter differs in the same way. "The Absolute" has a matter density of one, "All Worlds" has a density of 3 (one atom of "All Worlds" has a three times the density as one atom of "The Absolute"), "All Suns" 6, "Sun" 12, "All Planets" 24, "Earth" 48, "Moon" 96, "The Absolute" (which in this case represents dead matter) 192.

This way everything in the universe according to this cosmology is classified as matter. (Note that even the matter of density 12 is too rarefied for contemporary science to classify it as matter.)

Higher bodies
Gurdjieff's classification of Higher Bodies can be better represented on this scale. Physical body has the properties of the "Earth" level (that is, it has a density of 48 and it is subject to 48 laws). In comparison, a higher plane body would have a lighter density and it would be subject to a lesser number of laws (the amount varies on the level that the body falls under).

In the book Gnosis I, author Boris Mouravieff explains the names given to the notes of the solfege:

DOminus (God)
SIdereus orbis (Starry sky/Ensemble of all Worlds)
LActeus orbis (the Milky Way)
SOL (the Sun)
FAtum (Fate: the Planetary World, with direct influence on human destiny)
MIxtus orbis (the Earth, under the mixed rule of Good and Evil)
REgina astris (the Moon, ruler of human fate)

The names of the notes have historically been attributed to the hymn 'Ut queant laxis' by Paulus Diaconus, where UT is used instead of DO. Mouravieff explains UT as indicating the uterus in the birth of flesh, and SI as representing "the door of the second Birth, according to the Spirit".

Other properties

There are many other properties which can be displayed on the Ray of Creation such as: the evolution of the substances in the Universe, relationship between the cosmoses and the human body, etc. In a word, many of the properties of the laws of octaves could be displayed using the Ray of Creation. Some of the subtler properties of the law of octaves, and their effects, require that one have a knowledge of the laws of vibrations, and of involution and evolution, which knowledge today we call physics, acoustics, and music.

Ray of Creation in history

According to G. I. Gurdjieff, some of the ancient geocentric models don't represent an Earth-centered universe at all, but in reality display the Ray of Creation. This confusion was due to a lack of knowledge on the part of those examining the diagrams. Thus, the Ray of Creation is a part of ancient knowledge. It was also a part of modern knowledge, as shown by the fact that Gurdjieff learned it in Asia and the Middle-East, during the end of the 19th century and the early part of the 20th century. It became knowledge for us when he brought it to the West in the 20th century. At that time, it was noticed that fragments of this knowledge had been known from historical and ancient times.

See also

G. I. Gurdjieff 	
Earth Level
Fourth Way Enneagram 	
The Fourth Way 	
Centers (Fourth Way)

References

External links
 A description
 A somewhat advanced and multidisciplinary overview of Gurdjieff's cosmology
 Gurdjieff cosmology

Fourth Way terminology
Esoteric cosmology